The 1995 Ondrej Nepela Memorial was the 3rd edition of an annual senior-level international figure skating competition held in Bratislava, Slovakia. It took place between September 29 and October 1, 1995. Skaters competed in three disciplines: men's singles, ladies' singles, and ice dance. The competition is named for 1972 Olympic gold medalist Ondrej Nepela.

Results

Men

Ladies

Ice dance

Sources
 Official protocol

Ondrej Nepela Memorial, 1995
Ondrej Nepela Memorial
Ondrej Nepela Memorial, 1995